Shara District is a district (bakhsh) in Hamadan County, Hamadan Province, Iran. At the 2006 census, its population was 25,509, in 5,793 families.  The District has one city: Qahavand. The District has three rural districts (dehestan): Chah Dasht Rural District, Jeyhun Dasht Rural District, and Shur Dasht Rural District.

References 

Hamadan County
Districts of Hamadan Province